David Blackmore (December 19, 1909 — June 15, 1988) was a Welsh cricketer. He was a right-handed batsman who played first-class cricket for Glamorgan. He was born and died in Swansea.

Blackmore, who played on a regular basis for Swansea Cricket Club, made just one first-class appearance, in 1934 against Somerset, and while he made 34 runs with the bat, this was to prove to be his only innings in Glamorgan colours.

Ten years later, Blackmore would appear for a West of England XI in a friendly match against Glamorgan.

External links
David Blackmore at Cricket Archive 

1909 births
1988 deaths
Cricketers from Swansea
Welsh cricketers
Glamorgan cricketers